

Introduction 

The Learning Enrichment Foundation (LEF) is a Toronto-based organization that provides multiple services with a focus on skills training and economic development. The foundation provides immigrant settlement, supports language training, career exploration, job search supports, youth programs, and mentorship along with a variety of other skills training. The foundation is an advocate of integrated employment programs and accessible child care.

History

In the late 1970s, The Borough of York (now a municipality of Toronto) was going through a major economic downturn with closed factories, high unemployment and vacancies. This caused a decline in both incomes and tax revenue, deflating rent prices. As a result, the region became attractive to a wave of recent immigrants. However, without the tax revenue, the Borough was unable to provide adequate social, education, and employment services.

In response to these circumstances, a group of community stakeholders formed a charitable organization which incorporated itself as the Learning Enrichment Foundation in 1978. LEF started by providing multicultural theatre for children but quickly diversified into skill training and youth counseling.

Over the years, LEF has continued to initiate programs and services that reflect the needs of the local community. As a reception area for recent immigrants and as the part of the Greater Toronto Area with the highest levels of poverty indicators, there was much to be accomplished. LEF now is a leader in community economic development, particularly as it relates to human capital, and still serves the local community. However, poverty and unemployment are not unique to the former City of York, and LEF continues to attract people from across the GTA.

In the early 1980s, LEF opened child care centers, launched employment services and skills training programs. Programs and services include skill training in areas where there are local jobs, job search, counselling, recruitment service for employers, self-employment training and support, training enterprises including LEF Wood Works and Cooks Training for at risk youth, technology help desk, computer access sites, Language Instruction for Newcomers to Canada (LINC) classes and literacy classes, a training loan fund, several social enterprises, 18 child care centers and 16 Before & After School Programs and a kitchen in which LEF prepares 500 meals a day through a partnership with Second Harvest. These meals go to agencies which serve the homeless. LEF provides a hearty soup lunch to all clients in the building every Thursday, and to LINC nursery children (30 to 35) every day.

By 1991, LEF outgrew its facility and moved into its current location on Industry Street. LEF has developed many co-operative relationships with many different government departments as well as local organizations and networks in order to plan, improve, and develop innovative solutions to local needs. These include: social service (e.g. Second Harvest), immigrant service (e.g. OCASI), child care (e.g. York Early Years), disadvantaged youth (e.g. The Court’s Diversionary Program) and ex-convicts (Pardons Canada).

In relation to local employment, the co-operative relationships include specific skill training and recruitment for local employers, sharing job leads with 300 community partners weekly, active networking with many other organizations, umbrella groups and individuals, through referrals, collaboration and regular meetings. LEF is a founding member of The Canadian Community Economic Development Network and active on membership and Human Capital Development Committees and on the Policy Council. LEF is also a founding member of the Ontario and the Canadian CAP Networks.

Bicycle Assembly & Maintenance Program 

To address Toronto's growth of cycling and the consequent need for skilled bicycle mechanics, the Learning Enrichment Foundation partnered with the Bicycle Trade Association of Canada to create a training program. Launched in the winter of 2009, the first set of graduates will be ready for placements by April 2009.

Employment Services 

LEF operates a free employment service that connects job seekers and employers. In addition, it runs a career exploration program, operates a resource centre, and maintains a "windfall cupboard" that gives clothing for interviews.

Language Instruction 

The Learning Enrichment Foundation runs an English as a second language program called Language Instruction for Newcomers to Canada (LINC) which all Permanent Resident or Convention Refugees are eligible to take for free.

In addition, the Foundation runs a Literacy and Numeracy class which aims to improve reading, writing, and basic mathematic skills.

Child Care 

LEF operates 33 licensed Child Care Centres for hundreds of children in addition to Before And After Programs for around 1200 children.

References

External links
 The Learning Enrichment Foundation Official Site
 Pan-Canadian Community Development Learning Network Profile of Effective Practice: Learning Enrichment Foundation

Organizations based in Toronto